Nalžovské Hory is a town in Klatovy District in the Plzeň Region of the Czech Republic. It has about 1,200 inhabitants.

Administrative parts
The municipality is made up of villages of Krutěnice, Letovy, Miřenice, Nalžovy, Neprochovy, Otěšín, Sedlečko, Stříbrné Hory, Těchonice, Ústaleč, Velenovy, Zahrádka and Žďár.

Geography
Most of the municipal territory lies in the Blatná Uplands. The territory is rich in small streams and ponds.

History
The first written mention of Nalžovy is from 1379. Stříbrné Hory was founded in 1521 as a mining settlement and it became a market town in 1530. The mining of silver, lead and tin ended in 1585.

In 1769 the Nalžovy estate was acquired by Nicholas Taaffe, 6th Viscount Taaffe, however, the family memoirs identify his son Francis as the first owner. The Viscounts Taaffe were the most significant owners of the estate. They owned Nalžovy until 1937, when Richard Taaffe sold it to brothers František and Karel Müller.

The Müller brothers were entrepreneurs who reconstructed farm buildings, produced cheese here and cultivated improved varieties of rye and oats. After World War II, their properties were confiscated and the brothers had to emigrate. The castle was returned to the Müller family in 1993, but in 2008 they sold it to a private company.

The municipality was established in 1952 by the merger of Stříbrné Hory with Nalžovy. It regained the town status in 2008.

Demographics

Sights

On the site of a former fortress documented in 1380, the Renaissance Nalžovy Castle was built in 1618–1620. In 1745 it was modified in the Baroque style. The castle is surrounded by an English park from the early 17th century with romantic modifications from around 1840. Today the castle and the park are privately owned and inaccessible to the public.

The Viscounts Taaffe had artificial ruins resembling their former Irish family home, Ballymote Castle, built in the nearby forest on the Prašivice hill around 1840. A forest park with stone statues of a dragon and a turtle was created around the ruins.

The Church of Saint Catherine in Stříbrné Hory was built in the Baroque style in 1721–1723. Stations of the Cross next to the church dates from the 19th century.

Notable people
Eduard Taaffe, 11th Viscount Taaffe (1833–1895), Austrian politician; died at Nalžovy Castle
Karel Klostermann (1848–1923), writer; attended school in Stříbrné Hory
Josef Antonín Hůlka (1851–1920), Bishop of České Budějovice
Richard Taaffe (1898–1967), Austrian-Irish gemmologist

Gallery

References

External links

Populated places in Klatovy District
Cities and towns in the Czech Republic